Liberty Institute is a Georgian research and advocacy organization affiliated with Ilia Chavchavadze State University. The Institute provides legal services in the field of civil and human rights, runs public campaigns, and conducts legal, educational, and legislative activities to promote democratic values, liberal values, public accountability, and control mechanisms to support the development of democratic institutions in Georgia.

History
The Liberty Institute was founded in 1996, shortly after the events related to Rustavi 2, an independent TV station which had its broadcast license revoked about a month earlier by the Georgian Ministry of Communications. This move was criticized as a violation of freedom of speech and a threat to independent media. At the time, few civil rights organizations were active. 

On July 10, 2002, a group of 20 well-trained aggressors entered the office of the Liberty Institute and physically injured organization members Levan Ramishvili, Sozar Subari, David Zurabishvili, Giga Phrangishvili, and Dali Tskitishvili, and ransacked the office.

Multiple members of the Liberty Institute were elected into positions of office: Giga Bokeria became the deputy chairman of the Committee on Legal Issues, and a member of the Committee on Defense and Security. 
Givi Targamadze, became the chair of Georgian Parliamentary Committee on Defense and Security. In 2004, a member of the Liberty Institute, Sozar Subari, was elected by the Parliament of Georgia as Public Defender (Ombudsman) for a 5-year term. A former member of the Liberty Institute, Gigi Ugulava, became the mayor of Tbilisi. Another former member of the Liberty Institute, Zurab Tchiaberashvili, was appointed as the ambassador to the Council of Europe. In 2005, a member of the Liberty Institute, Tamar Kintsurashvili, was elected by the board of governors of the Georgian Public Broadcaster as its first director general. Konstantine Vardzelashvili was appointed as the Deputy Minister of Justice in 2004. Anna Zhvania was appointed initially as an advisor to the President in 2006 and then she was appointed as the first female head of Foreign Intelligence Special Service of Georgia. Former executive director of the Liberty Institute, Akaki Minashvili, was elected to the Parliament of Georgia. In December 2008, he was elected as the chairman of the Committee on Foreign Affairs. Before that, he was the deputy chairman of the Committee on Legal Issues.

Activities
In February 2003, a constitutional amendment majorly backed by the Liberty Institute was adopted to introduce trial by jury in Georgia. The Liberty Institute played a major role in drafting the 1999 General Administrative Code of Georgia, Laws on Higher Education, and General Education adopted by parliament in 2004 and 2005, the Law on the Freedom of Speech and Expression, and the Law on Broadcasting.

It produces a monthly magazine, Liberty. Apart from the Tbilisi head office, the Liberty Institute operates five regional offices in Georgia.

Other campaigns
Aside from human rights advocacy, the institute has extended its focus to various other fields:

The Liberty Institute has worked to support investigative journalism in Georgia. Givi Targamadze, Chief Coordinator of the Journalistic Investigations Program of the Institute conducted a number of investigations that were published in newspapers, contributing to the dismissal of the Ministers of Communications, Agriculture, and Energy, in 1998–2000. In the context of anti-corruption campaigns, the Liberty Institute has frequently uncovered corruption and legal violations in government. In 1998–2000, anti-corruption campaigns by the Institute and its members included: the criminal activities of David Bezhuashvli MP and Levan Mamaladze, governor of the Kvemo-Kartli region; corruption and legal violations at the Ministries of Agriculture and Communications; involvement of the Ministries of Interior and Security in smuggling tobacco, petroleum and alcohol; and the criminal interests and illegal business activities of President Eduard Shevardnadze's family.
Since 2001 together with the students' movement the LI carried out the anticorruption campaign at the Tbilisi Ivane Javakhishvili State University. In the frame of the campaign the survey was held and the corrupt faculties and lecturers were publicly named. The members of the movement investigated the facts of misuse of university funds and multiple financial abuses. Materials found by the LI were handed to Anticorruption Council and Prosecutor's Office.
First protest to denounce religious violence was carried out by the Institute on October 19, 1999. Liberty Institute protested against religious extremism and of violence against religious minorities. Liberty Institute made these problems discussed by the public. Since 1998 Liberty Institute protested against religious extremism existed in the Orthodox Church of Georgia, the Liberty Institute always strictly reacted on every fact of violation of religious freedom and carried 2 cases in the constitutional court. The Liberty Institute strictly reacted and denounced attack on the Baptist Church by the Police in Tianeti region; Attack on congregation of the Evangelist Church "Madli" in the Gldani District of Tbilisi; Illegal arrest of religious literature on the border by the State. It always protected rights of Jehovah's Witnesses, when Basil Mkalavishvili and his supporters were attacking them and protested the cessation of registration of Jehovah's Witnesses by court; Liberty Institute was fighting against the trend of transferring churches belonging to the Catholics to the Orthodox Church by the state and protected the rights of Orthodox congregations that do not belong to the Georgian Orthodox Patriarchate. Religious extremism became the subject of active public debates in Georgia following Liberty Institute's campaigns against violations of religious rights. Liberty Institute also initiated two cases defending the rights of religious minorities at the Constitutional Court.
One of the main directions of the institute's activism has been prevention and aversion of facts of illegal arrest, torture during the pre-trial detention and prevention of the illegal actions and violation of the human rights in the law enforcement agencies. In 1998, the Liberty Institute carried out a special project, which aimed to monitor the Police raids. As a result of which a lot of fact of illegalness and torture was found. In 2000, based on the initiative of the Liberty Institute, a Public Review Board was established at the Ministry of Justice. The council has been a major mechanism of civil control of the penitentiary system. In 2004 Liberty Institute together with Ombudsman's office created Public Councils, the members of which have a right to enter and carry the monitoring over the pre-trial detention and police stations at any time without restrictions.
Liberty Institute supported the youth movements in Georgia. Liberty Institute encouraged the development of youth movements such as independent student's self-governing bodies within the Universities and created civil liberties youth network throughout the country; Due to Liberty Institute activities the first active youth movement Kmara emerged in Georgia in 2003 and has already played a crucial role in defending and promoting civil and political rights in Georgia. Liberty Institute provided 800 activists with practical trainings. Currently, within the framework of the Civil Liberties Youth Network, Liberty Institute leads a series of youth debates in Georgia's regions aimed at promoting civic values and anti-corruption ethics among high school and local university students through discussions on the history and philosophy of constitutional rights among youth. The goal of the debates is also to foster critical thinking and leadership skills among youth.
Liberty Institute prepared the first Professional Standards of Media in Georgia in 2003, which was adopted by the major national and regional TV Companies and newspapers.
Liberty Institute is also active in terms of legal initiatives and has an experience of legal drafting. The Law on the Freedom of Speech and Expression adopted by the Parliament of Georgia in 2004 was prepared by the LI. This law was estimated by the Georgian and international experts as the most democratic law in the post-communistic area. In 2004 the Parliament of Georgia adopted the Law on Broadcasting also prepared by the Liberty Institute. According this law on the basis of the state TV the Public Broadcasting Service will be developed. Liberty Institute proposed constitutional amendment to introduce the jury system and now works on drafting of criminal procedural code. The Parliament of Georgia accepted this proposal in 2004. In 2003 The Parliament of Georgia adopted the Law about confiscation of illegally earned property. In 1997 prepared the Freedom of Information chapter of the General Administrative Code, which was adopted in 1999 by the Parliament.
The liberty Institute has campaigned for the establishment of effective civil control over the human rights; LI provides practical help to local communities to defend their rights. These activities include individual legal consultation, Court representational activities and civil campaigns to make the society mobilized over the specific facts of violation of human rights.
Liberty Institute has always participated and supported the educational reform in Georgia. The part of the law of the education accepted by the parliament of Georgia in 2004 was created in the LI. The part covers the rights of students and academic freedom. According to the LI initiative the School boards in public schools was created in Georgia since 2003.

The Liberty Institute provides resources and training for various social and professional groups about enhancing effectiveness, professionalism, active citizenship, principles of civil responsibility, accountability and transparency within society.

External links
Official Webpage of the Liberty Institute

Political organisations based in Georgia (country)
Liberal organizations